This is a list of Lianhuanhua produced in China sorted by year then alphabetical order.

Preliminary List
The preliminary list is for books that were created before the term Lianhuanhua became the standard.  Materials on this list are subject to debate.

1920s

1930s

1940s

1950s

1960s

1970s

1980s

References

Manhua
Lists of comics by country